Victory Garden is a work of electronic literature by American author Stuart Moulthrop. It was written in StorySpace and published by Eastgate Systems in 1992. It is often discussed along with Michael Joyce's afternoon, a story as an important work of hypertext fiction.

Plot and structure

Victory Garden is a hypertext novel which is set during the Gulf War, in 1991. The story centres on Emily Runbird and the lives and interactions of the people connected with her life. Although Emily is a central figure to the story and networked lives of the characters, there is no one character who could be classed as the protagonist. Each character in Victory Garden lends their own sense of perspective to the story and all characters are linked through a series of bridges and connections.

There is no set "end" to the story. Rather there are multiple nodes that provide a sense of closure for the reader. In one such "ending", Emily appears to die. However, in another "ending", she comes home safe from the war. How the story plays out depends on the choices the reader makes during their navigation of the text. The passage of time is uncertain as the reader can find nodes that focus on the present, flashbacks or even dreams and the nodes are frequently presented in a non-linear fashion. The choices the reader makes can lead them to focus on individual characters, meaning that while there are a series of characters in the story the characters focused on can change with each reading, or a particular place.

Upon entering the work the reader is presented with a series of choices as to how to navigate the story. The reader may enter the text through a variety of means: the map of the 'garden', the lists of paths, or by the composition of a sentence. Each of these paths guides the reader though fragmented pieces of the story (in the form of node) and by reading and rereading many different paths the reader receives different perspectives of the different characters.

Characters

Emily:
 Emily has been through law school and she has an older brother [firm]
 Emily is in the Gulf War 
 Emily is with Boris but may have had something with the Victor? [Dear Victor]
 Emily has been with Boris for 3 years, losing love for him? [No genius]
 Emily’s surname is Runbird [a true story]
 Emily is reading “Blood and Guts in High Schools” which Boris sent her [blood & guts in S.A.]
 Flashes back to a morning with Boris, hints towards an event earlier on in their relationship, Boris has facial hair, Emily it undecided on whether she likes it or not [Facial hair]
 Same morning, a little later on, Emily doesn’t approve of the facial hair, thinks of it as false advertising [face it]
 Back to current time, Emily is writing to Boris, Thea is depressed, Veronica needs to pay the car insurance. Boris is expected to have bought a new bed [Dear you]
 Lucy is Emily’s Mother
 She also has a younger sister by the name of Veronica
 Emily is a fit agile woman

Thea Agnew:
 She is a professor at a University in the town of Tara. 
 Emily and her sister Veronica are her pupils. 
 She has a teenaged son named Leroy who has recently left school to take his own "On the Road" tour of the United States. 
 Central to the plot of Victory Garden is Thea's role as head of a Curriculum Revision Committee looking at the subject of Western Civilization as well her discovery with a group of friends that a popular local creek has been sold to a company intending to build a golf course nearby. 
 One of the pivotal scenes in Victory Garden occurs at Thea's house. During a party an appearance from Uqbari the Prophet leads to a gun being fired off in her back yard which results in the intervention of police and the accidental beating of Harley.

There are many reoccurring characters in Victory Garden. This includes Harley, Boris Urquhart, Veronica, Leroy, and others.

Politics

According to David Ciccoricco, "Although some early critics were quick to see Victory Garden as rooted in a leftist political ideology, Moulthrop's narrative is not unequivocally leftist. Its political orientation in a sense mirrors its material structure, for neither sits on a stable axis. In fact, Moulthrop is more interested in questioning how a palette of information technologies contributes to—or, for those who adopt the strong reading, determines—the formation of political ideologies. In addition to popular forms of information dissemination, this palette would include hypertext technology, which reflexively questions its own role in disseminating information as the narrative of Victory Garden progresses.

Citing Sven Birkerts' observation that attitudes toward information technologies do not map neatly onto the familiar liberal/conservative axis, Moulthrop writes:

Newt Gingrich and Timothy Leary have both been advocates of the Internet... I am interested less in old ideological positions than in those now emerging, which may be defined more by attitudes toward information and interpretive authority than by traditional political concerns. (Moulthrop 1997, 674 n4)

The politics of Victory Garden, much like its plot, do not harbor foregone conclusions. In a 1994 interview, Moulthrop says it 'is a story about war and the futility of war, and about its nobility at the same time' (Dunn 1994)."

Critical reception
As one of the classics of hypertext fiction, Victory Garden has been discussed and analysed by many critics, including Robert Coover, Raine Koskimaa, James Phelan and E. Maloney, Robert Selig, David Ciccoricco, and Silvio Gaggi.

References

External links
 Eastgate
Victory Garden
Victory Garden Sampler

Hypertext
Electronic literature works
1992 American novels